Drino is a genus of flies in the family Tachinidae.

Species and Subgenera
Subgenus Drino Robineau-Desvoidy, 1863
Drino adiscalis (Chao, 1982)
Drino angustifacies (Mesnil, 1949)
Drino angustivitta Liang & Chao, 1998
Drino antennalis (Reinhard, 1922)
Drino argenticeps (Macquart, 1851)
Drino auripollinis Chao & Liang, 1998
Drino bakeri (Coquillett, 1897)
Drino cordata (Curran, 1927)
Drino cubaecola (Jaennicke, 1867)
Drino densichaeta Chao & Liang, 1998
Drino facialis (Townsend, 1928)
Drino flava Chao & Liang, 1992
Drino hainanica Liang & Chao, 1998
Drino hunanensis Chao & Liang, 1993
Drino imberbis (Wiedemann, 1830)
Drino inca (Townsend, 1911)
Drino incompta (Wulp, 1890)
Drino interfrons (Sun & Chao, 1992)
Drino laticornis Chao & Liang, 1998
Drino longicapilla Chao & Liang, 1998
Drino longihirta Chao & Liang, 1992
Drino lota (Meigen, 1824)
Drino maroccana Mesnil, 1951
Drino minuta Liang & Chao, 1998
Drino parafacialis Chao & Liang, 1998
Drino rhoeo (Walker, 1849)
Drino vicina (Zetterstedt, 1849)
Subgenus Palexorista Townsend, 1921
Drino aequalis (Malloch, 1935)
Drino amicula Mesnil, 1949
Drino ampliceps (Karsch, 1886)
Drino aureocincta Mesnil, 1977
Drino aureola Mesnil, 1970
Drino auricapita Chao & Liang, 1998
Drino aurifera (Villeneuve, 1943)
Drino bancrofti (Crosskey, 1967)
Drino bisetosa (Baranov, 1932)
Drino bohemica Mesnil, 1949
Drino crassiseta Mesnil, 1968
Drino curvipalpis (Wulp, 1893)
Drino deducens (Walker, 1859)
Drino disparis (Sabrosky, 1976)
Drino flavicans (Wiedemann, 1819)
Drino flaviseta (Thomson, 1869)
Drino gilva (Hartig, 1838)
Drino gilvoides (Curran, 1927)
Drino idonea (Brauer & von Bergenstamm, 1891)
Drino immersa (Walker, 1859)
Drino inconspicua (Meigen, 1830)
Drino inconspicuoides (Baranov, 1932)
Drino iterata Mesnil, 1949
Drino laetifica Mesnil, 1950
Drino latigena (Mesnil, 1944)
Drino lavinia (Curran, 1927)
Drino longicornis Chao & Liang, 1992
Drino longiforceps Chao & Liang, 1998
Drino lucagus (Walker, 1849)
Drino macquarti (Crosskey, 1973)
Drino mayneana (Villeneuve, 1930)
Drino melancholica Mesnil, 1949
Drino nova Mesnil, 1949
Drino obliterata Mesnil, 1949
Drino painei (Baranov, 1934)
Drino patruelis Mesnil, 1949
Drino pulchra (Curran, 1927)
Drino quadrizonula (Thomson, 1869)
Drino rufa Zeegers, 2007
Drino salva (Wiedemann, 1830)
Drino sinensis Mesnil, 1949
Drino solennis (Walker, 1858)
Drino sororcula Mesnil, 1949
Drino subanajama (Townsend, 1927)
Drino subaurata (Walker, 1853)
Drino succini (Giebel, 1862)
Drino summaria (Townsend, 1927)
Drino tenella (Bezzi, 1911)
Drino terrosa Mesnil, 1949
Drino ugandana (Curran, 1927)
Drino upoluae (Malloch, 1935)
Drino wuzhi Liang & Chao, 1998
Subgenus Zygobothria Mik, 1891
Drino atra Liang & Chao, 1998
Drino atropivora (Robineau-Desvoidy, 1830)
Drino ciliata (Wulp, 1881)
Drino grandicornis Mesnil, 1977
Drino hirtmacula (Liang & Chao, 1990)
Drino longiseta Chao & Liang, 1998
Drino lugens (Mesnil, 1944)
Drino pollinosa Chao & Liang, 1998
Drino trifida (Wulp, 1890)

References

Tachinidae genera
Exoristinae
Taxa named by Jean-Baptiste Robineau-Desvoidy
Diptera of South America
Diptera of North America
Diptera of Asia
Diptera of Africa
Diptera of Europe
Diptera of Australasia